This is a list of the Spanish and Algerine governors or Beys of Oran.

See also

 List of Beys of the Western Beylik

 List of mayors of Oran, 1832–present
 Timeline of Oran
Algeria
Heads of state of Algeria
Presidents of Algeria
Heads of government of Algeria
Colonial heads of Algeria
Lists of office-holders

Algeria history-related lists
Oran, governors
Oran, governors
Oran
Oran, governors
Ottoman Algeria